The 1997 NCAA Rifle Championships were contested at the 18th annual competition to determine the team and individual national champions of NCAA co-ed collegiate rifle shooting in the United States. The championship was hosted by Murray State University in Murray, Kentucky. 

Three-time defending champions West Virginia once again topped the team standings, finishing a mere three points (6,214–6,211) ahead of Alaska. This was the Mountaineers' thirteenth team title.

The individual champions were, for the smallbore rifle, Karyn Juziuk (Xavier), and Emily Caruso (Norwich), for the air rifle.

Qualification
Since there is only one national collegiate championship for rifle shooting, all NCAA rifle programs (whether from Division I, Division II, or Division III) were eligible. A total of seven teams ultimately contested this championship (an increase of one team from 1996).

Results
Scoring:  The championship consisted of 120 shots by each competitor in smallbore and 40 shots per competitor in air rifle.

Team title

Individual events

References

NCAA Rifle Championship
NCAA Rifle Championships
1998 in shooting sports
NCAA Rifle Championships